Clostridium grantii is a Gram-positive, strictly anaerobic, rod-shaped and spore-forming bacterium from the genus Clostridium which has been isolated from the gut of a mullet.

References

 

Bacteria described in 1996
grantii